Ercole Gualazzini (born 22 June 1944) is a retired Italian professional road bicycle racer. Gualazzini won stages in all the Grand Tours.

Major results

1969
Vuelta a España:
Winner stage 18A
1970
Tour d'Indre-et-Loire
1971
Giro d'Italia:
Winner stage 3
1972
Tour de France:
Winner stage 3A
1974
Tour de France:
Winner stage 1
1977
Sassari — Cagliari

External links 

Official Tour de France results for Ercole Gualazzini

Italian male cyclists
1944 births
Living people
Italian Tour de France stage winners
Italian Giro d'Italia stage winners
Italian Vuelta a España stage winners
Sportspeople from the Province of Parma
Cyclists from Emilia-Romagna